Grand Duke of Bosnia, was a court title in the Kingdom of Bosnia, bestowed by the monarch to highest military commanders, usually reserved for most influential and most capable among highest Bosnian nobility. To interpret it as an office post rather than a court rank could be more accurate, although it was not hereditary it served both purposes and was retained for life by a noblemen who gained it.

History 
Unlike usage in Western Europe or Central Europe, as well as in various Slavic lands from Central to North-East Europe, where analogy between grand duke and grand prince was significant, with both titles corresponding to sovereign lower than king but higher than duke, in Bosnia the title of grand duke corresponded more to the Byzantine military title megas doux.

Generally, Slavic word knez is often referred to ruler, sometimes analogous to king, thus veliki knez was more like high king than grand duke. In that sense, although like in rest of South Slavic neighboring states and among its nobility, in Bosnia also existed the title knez or veliki knez, nominally analogous to prince and grand prince, it was in fact ranked as medium to major feudal landlord, with corresponding influence in the Bosnian Stanak (also Great Bosnian Rusag, Whole of Bosnia), which was institute of assembly of all Bosnian nobility, regardless of rank and status.

However, in neighboring countries title duke, in Slavic vojvoda, also had military signification, but in that sense "grand duke" was specifically, even exclusively, Bosnian title.

Accordingly, the title Grand Duke of Bosnia was explicitly given by Bosnian ruler, whether ban, king or queen, to their highest-ranking military commander. As such, it was an actually more like an office rather than a court rank, although it was also a grade in the court order of precedence, and was often held by one individual at the time, rarely two.

Title-holders
 Hrana Vuković (?-1380)
 Hrvoje Vukčić Hrvatinić (1380–1416)
 Vlatko Vuković (1380–1392)
 Petar Pavlović (until death in March 1420)
 Radislav Pavlović (from 1420, first recorded 1427)
 Sandalj Hranić (1392–1435)
 Stjepan Vukčić Kosača (1435–1466)
 Vladislav Hercegović (first recorded 1469–1482)

See also

List of grand dukes of Bosnia
Kingdom of Bosnia
Banate of Bosnia
Medieval Bosnia

Further reading
 "Veliki vojvoda bosanski Sandalj Hranić Kosača", Esad Kurtović, publisher Institut za istoriju Sarajevo, 2009
 "Viteske svecanosti u Budimu 1412. godine i ucesce bosanskih predstavnika (Festivities held in Buda in 1412 and the participation of Bosnian magnates)", Emir O. Filipović, Spomenica akademika Marka Šunjića (1927-1998), Filozofski fakultet u Sarajevu, 2010

References

Kingdom of Bosnia
Noble titles
Titles of national or ethnic leadership
 
Court titles of medieval Bosnia
Military ranks of medieval Bosnia